Cymothoe harmilla is a butterfly in the family Nymphalidae. It is found in Cameroon, Gabon and the Democratic Republic of the Congo.

Subspecies
Cymothoe harmilla harmilla (Nigeria, south-western Cameroon, Gabon)
Cymothoe harmilla kraepelini Schultze, 1912 (south-eastern Cameroon)
Cymothoe harmilla micans Bouyer & Joly, 1995 (eastern Democratic Republic of the Congo)

References

Butterflies described in 1874
Cymothoe (butterfly)
Butterflies of Africa
Taxa named by William Chapman Hewitson